The Granville Melodramas is a British television series which aired from 1955 to 1956. Cast included John Bailey, Erik Chitty, Victoria Grayson, Hattie Jacques, and Helen Shingler. It was a drama produced by  Associated-Rediffusion Television.

The series is missing from the archives.

References

External links

1955 British television series debuts
1956 British television series endings
Lost television shows
Black-and-white British television shows
English-language television shows
ITV television dramas
1950s British drama television series